On 27 May 2016, a Boeing 777-300 of Korean Air, operating as Korean Air Flight 2708 from Haneda Airport in Tokyo to Seoul's Gimpo International Airport, was accelerating for take off when its left engine suffered an uncontained failure and a substantial fire ensued. The crew aborted the take-off, and after the aircraft came to a stop the fire was extinguished by the airport emergency services. All 319 passengers and crew were evacuated; 12 occupants were injured. The accident was attributed to poor maintenance standards and failure of the crew to carry out the emergency procedures correctly.

Aircraft and crew 

The aircraft operating Flight 2708 was a Boeing 777-3B5 equipped with two Pratt & Whitney PW4000 engines, registered HL7534, serial number 27950. The 120th Boeing 777 produced, it first flew on 4 February 1998, and was delivered new to Korean Air on 28 December 1999.

The 49-year-old captain had logged a total of 10,410 flight hours, including 3,205 hours on the Boeing 777. The 41-year-old first officer had 5,788 hours with 2,531 of them on the Boeing 777.

Accident 
As the aircraft was taking off from Runway 34R at Tokyo Haneda, the pilots heard a loud bang coming from the left. The pilots aborted the takeoff and the aircraft came to a stop, whereupon an evacuation commenced. All the occupants escaped, but 12 passengers were injured and were taken to a hospital near the airport. Incoming flights were diverted to Tokyo's Narita International Airport and to Osaka. The airport firefighters quickly extinguished the fire. The aircraft reportedly travelled 700 metres down the runway before coming to a stop, with engine-parts scattered 600 metres from the point at which the aircraft began accelerating and tire-marks 700 metres from that point.

Impact 
Because of the incident, all four runways of Haneda Airport was closed, impacting a total of at least 36,000 passengers. Among the impacted was Toshinao Nakagawa, who was supposed to attend US President Barack Obama's speech at the Hiroshima Peace Memorial Museum as one of the elected officials of Hiroshima Prefecture. Nakagawa was unable to make the trip due to his flight being cancelled as a result of this accident.

Investigation 
The Japan Transport Safety Board (JTSB), the South Korean Aviation and Railway Accident Investigation Board (ARAIB), and the United States National Transportation Safety Board (NTSB) all investigated the accident, with assistance from experts in South Korea and the United States. On 30 May 2016, investigators revealed that the low-pressure turbine blades on the left (number one) Pratt & Whitney PW4090 engine had "shattered", with fragments piercing the engine cover, with fragments subsequently found on the runway. The engine's high-pressure turbine blades and high-pressure compressor were intact and free of abnormalities, and investigators found no evidence of a bird strike.

The aircraft was repaired and returned to service with Korean Air on 3 June 2016.

The final JTSB investigative report, released on 26 July 2018, discussed a significant number of problems related to the failure and the response of the crew and passengers to it. These included poor maintenance standards that overlooked a crack growing in the LP turbine disc in the engine created by metal fatigue that eventually failed, the failure of the crew to locate the list of emergency procedures for use in such an emergency, beginning evacuation of the aircraft whilst the engines were still turning meaning there was a risk of passengers being blown away by the engines, and passengers ignoring instructions to leave luggage behind when using the evacuation slides risking piercing of the slides. As a result of the fire, the FAA issued an Airworthiness Directive mandating inspection of engines of the type involved in the fire to evaluate the condition of the components which failed on Flight 2708.

See also 
Emirates Flight 521
British Airways Flight 2276
United Airlines Flight 328
United Airlines Flight 1175
American Airlines Flight 383 (2016)
British Airtours Flight 28M
Tibet Airlines Flight 9833
Red Air Flight 203

Notes

References

External links
 Japan Transport Safety Board
Profile of the accident 
 Original version of the accident report  - If the English and Japanese versions differ, the Japanese version has supremacy
 Presentation 
English translation of the accident report

2016 in Tokyo
Accidents and incidents involving the Boeing 777
Aviation accidents and incidents in 2016
Aviation accidents and incidents in Japan
2708
Haneda Airport
May 2016 events in Japan
Airliner accidents and incidents involving uncontained engine failure